How to Cut and Paste Mix Tape Vol.2 is the second DJ mix album mixed by DJ Yoda.

Track listing
 "Intro" / "Star Wars Theme" (featuring Crash Crew) - DJ Yoda
 "Ill Culinary Behaviour" - DJ Format
 "Creatures, Breakin' and Names" (featuring Laura Lee, Jimmy Castor Bunch & New Birth) - DJ Yoda
 "Glue" (featuring Biz Markie & Mr. Complex) - Beyond There
 "Cucumbers, Needles, Sandwiches & Jazz" (featuring Freda Payne, Johnny Guitar Watson, Martine Girault, The Delfonics & Charlie Parker Septet) - DJ Yoda
 "Lonely Piano" (featuring - Grinning Barns) - Quasimoto
 "Yoda Meets The A-Team" - DJ Yoda
 "Scratching & Keyboard Techniques" (featuring Dizzy Gillespie) - DJ Yoda
 "Quid Control" (featuring People Under The Stairs) - DJ Yoda
 "Mysterious Plot" (featuring Lee Dorsey) - DJ Yoda
 "Billie Holiday Turntablised" - DJ Yoda
 "We Got The Funk" - The Beatnuts
 "On the Reggae-lar Part 2" (featuring Honey Boy Martin, Don Drummond, Dandy Livingstone, The Cimmarons, Hopeton Lewis, Pat Kelly & The Uniques) - DJ Yoda
 "I Gotcha Opin" (Remix) - Black Moon
 "Drop" - The Pharcyde
 "One Two S**t" - A Tribe Called Quest
 "Only When I'm Drunk" - Tha Alkaholiks
 "Anything" (featuring Wu-Tang Clan) - SWV
 "C.R.E.A.M." - Wu-Tang Clan
 "Tony Mozzarelli Wants 80's Pop" / "The Godfather" - DJ Yoda
 "Yoda's 80's Pop Megamix" (featuring Rick Astley, Bomb the Bass, Hall & Oates, Five Star & Taylor Dayne) - DJ Yoda
 "Rhubarb Tart" (featuring John Cleese) - DJ Yoda
 "George Formby Turntablised" - DJ Yoda
 "Outro / Indiana Jones Theme" (featuring - Evelyn Glennie) - DJ Yoda

Reception
The album was positively received, with Allmusic giving it a four star review, describing it as " a combination DJ-technique workshop, hip-hop compilation and adolescent joke-fest".

References

DJ Yoda albums
DJ mix albums
2002 compilation albums